The Australian Regenerative Medicine Institute (ARMI) is an Australian medical research institute. Opened in April 2009, the institute is based at the  campus of Monash University, in the Monash Science Technology Research and Innovation Precinct.

ARMI is one of the world's largest regenerative medicine and stem cell research hubs. Its research aims to restore and regenerate damaged tissue and organs by injecting or implanting cells to allow the human body to heal and recover. Research focuses on developing effective treatments for a range of currently incurable diseases, such as cancer, arthritis and other musculoskeletal conditions, diabetes and cardiovascular diseases, as well as neurotrauma. In addition, ARMI is also looking at technologies to treat ageing itself via regeneration. Facilities at the Institute include FishCore, the largest zebrafish facility of its kind in the Southern Hemisphere.

Leadership
The institute was established through an 153 million joint venture between Monash University and the Victorian Government to deliver the next generation of discoveries in regenerative medicine. The Australian Regenerative Medicine Institute officially opened in April 2009. Its foundation director was Professor Nadia Rosenthal. Rosenthal has previously served at the European Molecular Biology Laboratory and Harvard Medical School.   Professor Peter Currie was appointed Director in February 2016, following Rosenthal's return to the US.

See also

Australian Stem Cell Centre
Health in Australia

References

External links 

Monash University website

Australian Regenerative Medicine Institute
Monash University
2009 establishments in Australia
Research institutes established in 2009